Anna Grigorievna Semenovich (born 1 March 1978) is a Russian singer, actress, model, and former competitive ice-dancer.

Skating-career 
Early in her career, Semenovich skated with Denis Samokhin. They competed at two World Junior Championships, placing 8th in 1993 and 7th in 1994. After a brief partnership with Maxim Kachanov, placing fifth at the 1994 Goodwill Games, she teamed up with Vladimir Fedorov in 1995. They won the Finlandia Trophy twice and competed on the Grand Prix of Figure Skating. The highlight of their partnership was competing at the 1998 World Championships, where they placed 15th. Their partnership ended in 1999 and Semenovich teamed up with Roman Kostomarov for one season. With Kostomarov, she is the Russian bronze medalist and competed at both the 2000 European Championships and the 2000 World Championships.

Following the end of that partnership, she reunited with Denis Samokhin and placed 4th at the 2001 Russian Championships. She eventually retired due to injury.

Results 
GP: Part of Champions Series from 1995; renamed Grand Prix in 1998

With Samokhin

With Kostomarov

With Fedorov

With Kachanov

Singing career
Following her retirement from skating, Semenovich began working as an actress, model, and singer. She sang with Blestyashchiye from 2003 to 2007. In March, 2007 she left the group to follow a solo career. In 2008, she released her album, Слухи. There was a single, На Моря, featuring Arash.

In April and May 2022, Semenovich participated in a series of concerts organized in order to support the 2022 Russian invasion of Ukraine.

Acting
Semenovich had a lead role in the 2008 Russian spy comedy Hitler goes Kaput!. She also played in the 2012 sequel Rzhevsky versus Napoleon.

References

External links

 

 Anna Semenovich at the Forbes

1978 births
Living people
Russian female ice dancers
Singers from Moscow
Figure skaters from Moscow
21st-century Russian singers
21st-century Russian women singers
Russian State University of Physical Education, Sport, Youth and Tourism alumni
Competitors at the 1994 Goodwill Games